The 2002 Nebraska Cornhuskers football team represented the University of Nebraska–Lincoln in the 2002 NCAA Division I-A football season. The team was coached by Frank Solich and played their home games in Memorial Stadium in Lincoln, Nebraska. Nebraska finished in 4th place in the Big 12 North Division and tied for 8th conference–wide, with a final record of 7–7 (3–5). With their loss to Ole Miss in the Independence Bowl, the Huskers streak of 40 straight winning seasons came to an end. Earlier, a loss to Iowa State knocked the Huskers out of the AP Poll for the first time since October 11, 1981. The run of 348 consecutive weeks in the rankings was the longest in college football history.

Schedule

Roster and coaching staff

Depth chart

Game summaries

Arizona State

Troy State

Utah State

Penn State

Iowa State

McNeese State

This was the first week Nebraska was not featured in the AP Poll since their 59-0 defeat of Colorado on October 10, 1981.

Missouri

Oklahoma State

Nebraska's first loss against Oklahoma State since 1961.

Texas A&M

Texas

Kansas

Kansas State

Colorado

Ole Miss

Rankings

After the season
Nebraska finished in 4th place in the Big 12 North Division and tied for 8th conference-wide, with a final record of 7-7 (3-5).

Awards

NFL and pro players
The following Nebraska players who participated in the 2002 season later moved on to the next level and joined a professional or semi-pro team as draftees or free agents.

References

Nebraska
Nebraska Cornhuskers football seasons
Nebraska Cornhuskers football